The Nash Airflyte Theater is an American dramatic anthology television series that was broadcast from September 21, 1950, through  March 15, 1951, on CBS on Thursday evenings. It originated from WCBS-TV in New York City at 10:30 p.m. The show was sponsored by the Nash Motor Co.; the Nash Airflyte was an automobile model produced by the company.

William Gaxton was the program's host. Mike Krich was story editor.

The series featured original teleplays and adaptations of works by famous writers, including Anton Chekhov, O.Henry and Agatha Christie.

The program broadcast the first televised adaptation of a Gilbert and Sullivan musical when it aired Trial by Jury on November 30, 1950, and its December 21, 1950, episode, "Molly Morgan", was the first TV adaptation of a work by John Steinbeck. The December 7, 1950, episode is believed to be Ronald Reagan's first TV credit. The initial TV appearances of Ruth Hussey and David Niven occurred on this program.

Nash Motors ended its sponsorship at a time when other automobile manufacturers were also dropping or reducing their sponsorships  of TV programs.

Guest stars
Other actors on the series included: 
 Joan Bennett
 Van Heflin
 Ann Rutherford

Production 
Marc Daniels was the producer and director; Sylvia Friedlander was the production manager.

Selected episodes

References

External links

The Nash Airflyte Theater at CVTA with episode list

1950 American television series debuts
1951 American television series endings
1950s American anthology television series
1950s American drama television series
Black-and-white American television shows
English-language television shows
American live television series
CBS original programming
Nash Motors